Dmytro Voronovskyi (born 3 January 1997, in Zaporizhzhia) is a Ukrainian weightlifter. He is a bronze medalist of the 2021 and 2022 European Weightlifting Championships.

Career 
Voronovskyi is a two-time junior and a U23 European champion.

He debuted at the senior level in 2021 when won bronze in the 55 kg category at the 2021 European Championships held in Moscow, Russia, where he lifted in total 247 kg. He participated in the 2021 World Championships in Tashkent, Uzbekistan, but there he showed worse performance than at the European championships lifting in total 236 kg and finishing 11th. The next year, he managed to repeat his success by winning another bronze medal at the 2022 European Championships held in Tirana, Albania.

Major results

Personal life 
Voronovskyi graduated from the Zaporizhzhia National University where he studied physical education.

References

External links 
 

1997 births
Living people
Sportspeople from Zaporizhzhia
Ukrainian male weightlifters
European Weightlifting Championships medalists
20th-century Ukrainian people
21st-century Ukrainian people